Shahajas Thekkan (born 25 October 1998) is an Indian professional footballer who plays as a defender for Indian Super League club Kerala Blasters.

Club career

Kerala Blasters 
In 2017, Shahjas signed for the reserve side of the Indian Super League side Kerala Blasters FC, and was a part of the Kerala Premier League winning side of the reserve side in the 2019–20 Kerala Premier League season. He was promoted to the senior side during the club's 2021 pre-season.

Gokulam Kerala 
In October 2021, Shahajas signed for I-League club Gokulam Kerala. On 7 March 2022, he played his debut match against Real Kashmir FC as a substitute for Luka Majcen in the 84th minute of the match, which ended in a 5–1 victory for Gokulam Kerala.

Career statistics

Club

Honours
'''Gokulam Kerala
 I-League: 2021–22

References 

1998 births
Living people
Indian footballers
Footballers from Kerala
Association football defenders
I-League players
I-League 2nd Division players
Ozone FC players
Kerala Blasters FC Reserves and Academy players
Gokulam Kerala FC players